The 1934 San Diego State Aztecs football team represented San Diego State Teachers College during the 1934 NCAA football season.

San Diego State competed in the Southern California Conference (SCC). The 1934 San Diego State team was led by head coach Walter Herreid in his fifth season with the Aztecs. They played home games at three San Diego sites: four games at Balboa Stadium, one game at Navy "Sports" Field, and one game on campus. The Aztecs finished the season with three wins, five losses and one tie (3–5–1, 2–1–1 SCIAC). Overall, the team was outscored by its opponents 61–106 points for the season.

Schedule

Notes

References

San Diego State
San Diego State Aztecs football seasons
San Diego State Aztecs football